Charles MacArthur Kornegay Jr. (born September 28, 1974) is a Spanish-American former professional basketball player.  The 6' 9", 235-lb power forward gained notoriety at Villanova University, before going on to star for the Raleigh Cougars of the USBL, and ultimately overseas. Cougars fans called him the "Chuck-wagon", "Chuck Diesel" and "Korn-dawg".

Basketball career
As a basketball standout at Southern Wayne High School in Dudley, North Carolina, Kornegay was heavily recruited by American universities.  He signed with nearby school, North Carolina State University.  He played at NCSU for the Wolfpack during the 1993–1994 season, before transferring to Villanova University in suburban Philadelphia, Pennsylvania.  He played for there for three seasons and led the Wildcats to Big East conference championships in 1995 and 1997. During his career at Villanova, the team won 70 of 93 games and was rated as high as #2 nationally by the Associated Press.  He ended his collegiate career with averages of 7.3 points per game and 5.6 rebounds per game.

After graduation, Kornegay was selected by the Yakima Sun Kings in the 3rd round with the 28th overall pick of the 1997 CBA draft. Instead of joining the CBA, Kornegay returned to his home state of North Carolina to star for the Raleigh Cougars in the 1997–1998 season, forming a formidable frontline with Lorenzo Charles and Greg Newton.

In 1998, Kornegay played professional basketball in Australia for the Brisbane Bullets of the NBL.  After his stint down under, Kornegay moved to Spain, and played for a number of teams in that country before eventually hanging on with the Spanish team Unicaja Malaga of the Euroleague.  He patrolled the pivot there from 2001 to 2004, and even represented Spain in their 3rd-place run through the 2001 European Basketball Championship in Turkey.  In 2005, Kornegay returned to Turkey to play for Besiktas ColaTurka of the Turkish Basketball League (TBL).  After his stint in Turkey, Kornegay moved back to Spain to play for Etosa Alicante. He coaches annually at his old college, Villanova, for summer basketball camp. The team he coached at camp won the high school championship in 2012.

In September 2015, Kornegay was announced as Basketball Coach at Souderton (PA) HS.

Achievements
1997 Villanova University defensive player of the year
1997 USBL All-Rookie Team
1998 named to second team all nbl (Australia)
1999 appeared in acb league finals
2001 Won Bronze at European Basketball Championship
2001 appeared in acb league finals
2002-2003 Led Euroleague in Blocked Shots
1999-2000 voted acb league most exciting player
2004 appeared in acb league finals

References

1974 births
Living people
American expatriate basketball people in Australia
American expatriate basketball people in Spain
American men's basketball players
Baloncesto Málaga players
Basketball players from North Carolina
Brisbane Bullets players
CB Lucentum Alicante players
Liga ACB players
Menorca Bàsquet players
NC State Wolfpack men's basketball players
Parade High School All-Americans (boys' basketball)
Real Betis Baloncesto players
Spanish men's basketball players
Spanish people of American descent
Villanova Wildcats men's basketball players